Jack Mekler (4 March 1932 – 1 July 2019) was a South African long-distance runner. As a boy in an orphanage, he became a self-taught runner. He was boosted by fierce self-determination that grew out of his lonely and harsh childhood experience.
His early life was spent in Johannesburg, where he attended Parktown Boys' High School.

He won the Comrades Marathon five times as well as various other marathons around the world. He competed for South Africa in various international games.

A 25 km Jackie Mekler race is held annually in Gauteng in his honour.

Early life 
Jackie Mekler was born in Johannesburg, South Africa. His parents emigrated to South Africa from Eastern Europe in the 1920s with little more than the clothing on their backs. Jackie’s mother developed Parkinson’s disease that crippled her and at the age of nine, Jackie was sent by his father to live at the Arcadia Orphanage. He grew up there, competing with boys in various sports, including cricket and soccer. At the age of thirteen, Mekler decided to improve his health and fitness by running. When he was sixteen, he joined the Germiston Callies club and started serious long-distance running.

Mekler finished seventh in the 1952 Comrades Marathon, became the Southern Transvaal Marathon Champion in 2:42:57 and won the Durban Athletic Club Marathon. In 1953 he finished fifth in the Comrades Marathon and defended his two marathon titles.

In 1954, he improved in a marathon in Port Elizabeth at 2:28:58 h and was one week later South African Marathon champion in 2:35:26 h. He won silver in the British Empire and Commonwealth Games marathon in Vancouver, and in the fall he again won the South Transvaal Championship and the Durban Athletic Club Marathon.

In 1957, he was again national marathon champion. In 1958 followed a third place in the South African Marathon Championship, his first victory in the Comrades Marathon. In 1959 he was third in the Comrades Marathon.

In 1960, he finished second in the South African Marathon Championship, remained at the Comrades Marathon at 5:56:32 h, first on the up-run track under six hours and won the London to Brighton Race.

In 1962, he was second in the Comrades Marathon, and in 1963 he set a track record of 5:51:20.

In 1964, he was with his personal best of 2:27:54 h second in the South African Marathon Championship for whites. At the Comrades Marathon he won for the fourth time. In 1965, he finished second there, in 1968 he moved with his fifth triumph with the previous record winners Arthur FH Newton, Hardy Ballington and Wally Hayward equal, and in 1969 he was third.

In May 2019, Mekler published his autobiography Running Alone. Mekler died in Cape Town on 1 July 2019 aged 87 years old. During his running career, he finished 41 marathons, winning 14, and 32 ultramarathons, winning 13. In addition, he raced in 403 races under the marathon distance.

References 

1932 births
2019 deaths
South African male long-distance runners
Sportspeople from Johannesburg
Athletes (track and field) at the 1954 British Empire and Commonwealth Games
Commonwealth Games silver medallists for South Africa
Commonwealth Games medallists in athletics
Alumni of Parktown Boys' High School
South African ultramarathon runners
White South African people
Medallists at the 1954 British Empire and Commonwealth Games